Jesse Blaze Snider (born September 19, 1982) is an American comic book writer, voice-over actor, TV and radio host, and rock musician. He is the eldest son of Twisted Sister frontman and vocalist Dee Snider.

Hosting
Snider has hosted MTV2 Rock, The MTV2 Rock Countdown, as well as shows on Fuse TV and HBO. He was the host of Haunted Live on the Travel Channel until the end of 2018.

He was a radio DJ on 98.5 The Bone as well as on WLIR-FM.

Narration and voice work
Snider has been the narrator of Food Paradise for the Travel Channel since 2014, and has also done narration for Museum Secrets (Smithsonian Channel).

He was the voice of Pizza Hut, GameStop, and Cheetos for a number of years.

Music

Snider was the music consultant for Dee Snider's film Strangeland (1998).

In 2008, Snider appeared on the reality television singing competition Rock the Cradle, which featured the offspring of famous singers competing against one another. Snider came in second place, behind winner Crosby Loggins.

Discography

Snider wrote and performed "G.U.T.", the theme song to his family's reality show Growing Up Twisted (2010). He also wrote "Rock 'n' Roll Ain't Dead", which he performed with his father Dee on the show. The song "Go With Me", written for his eldest daughter's christening, was also featured on the show.

In 2012, he released the single "Twisted" which would eventually appear on the album The Slip: Love Songs from a Serial Killer, produced by Matt Squire and GoodWill & MGI among others.

His single "Crank it Up" was featured in ESPN's coverage of NCAA college football in 2012.

In November 2014, the single "Promised Land" was featured on ESPN's Monday Night Football; it was performed by Snider and co-written with Frederick Scott. The music video was directed by John Herzfeld.

The soundtrack to the film Reach Me (2014) features the song "Alive" that Snider wrote and performed. John Herzfeld, who wrote and directed the film, also directed the music video.

Snider wrote and performed the theme song "Juggernaut" for The Movie Crypt podcast. The song was also used as the international theme song to the related TV series Holliston.

In 2016, Snider won in Novelty/Comedy category of the USA Songwriting Competition with his song "Fight to Death", cowritten with Freddy Scott. The song also won 3rd Overall Grand Prize. Also in 2016, he was named one of Music Connection's Hot 100 Live Unsigned Artists & Bands.

His song "Got Your Number" was featured in ESPN's "First Take" in March 2016.

In 2016 he also released his debut album 16, which included the songs "Crank it Up", "G.U.T.", "Go With Me", and "Rock 'n' Roll Ain't Dead".

His album Come With Me If You Want to Live was released in 2020.

Comic books
Snider's first professional work in comics was writing a Deadpool short called "Fun With Ninjas" (Marvel Comics Presents, volume 2 #10, August 2008).

In 2009, Snider created the Dead Romeo graphic novel series. On December 9, 2009, the first issue of an ongoing Toy Story comic from Boom! Studios written by Snider was released. He also wrote a four-issue prequel to the motion picture Strangeland for Fangoria Graphix called Strangeland: Seven Sins (only the first issue of the series was released before Fangoria went bankrupt).

In 2010 Snider worked with Marvel Comics again, writing the One-Shot "Hulk: Let the Battle Begin".

Snider wrote the reboot issues of the comic series Evil Ernie, drawn by Jason Craig. The first issue was released in October 2012.

On October 12, 2016 Snider released Black Light District: 6 Issues from Image Comics, a combination of comic book and soundtrack. It features six mini stories based on the six tracks from his EP album of the same name.

Personal life
Snider and wife Patti (m. 2007) are parents of four children: daughter Logan Lane (b. April 2009), sons Cassidy West and Grayson Wayne (b. September 2014), and daughter Parker Pryde (b. August 2016).  His youngest daughter was born on L.A.'s 405 Freeway in the car on the way to hospital.

References

External links
 
 

1982 births
American comics writers
Living people
Place of birth missing (living people)
American rock musicians
Singing talent show contestants